Dinitrotoluenes could refer to one of the following compounds:
 2,3-Dinitrotoluene
 2,4-Dinitrotoluene
 2,5-Dinitrotoluene
 2,6-Dinitrotoluene
 3,4-Dinitrotoluene
 3,5-Dinitrotoluene

External links 
 

Explosive chemicals
Nitrotoluenes